Hamidiye is a village in the Pazar District, Rize Province, in Black Sea Region of Turkey. Its population is 1,452 (2021).

History 
According to list of villages in Laz language book (2009), name of the village is K'utsuma. Most villagers are ethnically Laz and Georgian. According to Armenian traveller Minas Bijishkyan's book (1819), name of the village is Eski Trabzon which means "Old Trabzon" in Turkish.

Geography

References

Villages in Pazar District, Rize
Laz settlements in Turkey